Albert Pissis (1852–1914) was a prolific Mexican-American architect in San Francisco who studied at the École des Beaux-Arts in Paris, France and is credited with introducing the Beaux-Arts architectural style to San Francisco, California, designing a number of important buildings in the city in the years before and after the 1906 San Francisco earthquake.

Life and career
Pissis was born on April 26, 1852 in Guaymas in the Mexican state of Sonora.  His father was Jose Etienne Pissis (1808-1880), a native of France and a physician, who moved his family to San Francisco, California from Guaymas when Pissis was six.  His mother was Juana Bazozabel "Jane" de Bustamante (1824-1893), a native of Guaymas.

Pissis was one of the first Americans to study at the École des Beaux-Arts in Paris, France.  He returned in 1880 to San Francisco, which at the time was a fairly provincial Western town despite its wealth, with buildings designed in a variety of architectural styles.

In 1882, Pissis became a member of the American Institute of Architects (AIA) and, with his partner William P. Moore, designed a number of buildings in flamboyant Queen Anne and Eastlake styles.  However, by the 1890s he was a major figure in the Neoclassical (Classical Revival) movement, particularly Beaux-Arts, and introduced that style to San Francisco beginning with the Hibernia Bank building in 1892.  Initially considered revolutionary, the style became popular among the city's powerful commercial and banking concerns.  The dome he designed for the Emporium Department Store, now part of the Westfield San Francisco Centre, is often considered a "masterpiece".

Pissis played a major role in San Francisco's reconstruction following the Great Earthquake of 1906, both as a designer of a number of the city's landmark buildings, and as a member of the Committee of Fifty.  He was also President of the local AIA chapter from 1907 to 1908.

Although popular and internationally known at the time, Pissis's approach to design was derided by later critics as reactionary, and blamed for suppressing more original architects such as Frank Lloyd Wright and Louis Sullivan in favor of imitation of older European traditions.  However, in more recent years his buildings have been increasingly praised.

Pissis died on July 5, 1914 of pneumonia at age 62, in his suite at the St. Francis Hotel.  He was survived by his widow, Georgia, who in 1920 sold land to Redwood City, California that became Sequoia High School.

Notable works

Among the buildings Pissis designed are:
Hibernia Bank building at McAllister and Jones streets in San Francisco
The Emporium department store (originally called the "Parrot Building" and home of the California Supreme Court), now part of the Westfield San Francisco Centre.
James Flood Building at Market and Powell Street in San Francisco, California.
The White House department store (now Banana Republic store and White House Garage) at Grant and Sutter Street, San Francisco, California.
Temple Sherith Israel in Pacific Heights, San Francisco
Mechanics' Institute Library, San Francisco, California
University House, Berkeley
the Bank of Eureka Building

References

1852 births
1914 deaths
19th-century French architects
20th-century French architects
American alumni of the École des Beaux-Arts
Architects from San Francisco